"The Shores of Botany Bay", also known as "Botany Bay", is a traditional Irish song. The song's narrator is a bricklayer who emigrates from Ireland to Australia after quitting his job laying bricks and mortar on the docks, with long hours and poor treatment by his bosses. Although his job is supported by a pension, he hears rumors of the Australian Gold Rush and sails away.

Recordings
"The Shores of Botany Bay" has been recorded many times by a variety of artists, including:

 Quilty on the album I'm Here Because I'm Here
 The Irish Rovers on the album Come Fill Up Your Glasses
 The Wolfe Tones on the album Irish To the Core
 The Dublin City Ramblers on the album Flight of Earls
 Tommy Makem and Liam Clancy on the album In Concert
 Patrick Clifford on the album American Wake
 Blaggards on the album Standards
 Derek Warfield & The Young Wolfe Tones on the album Far Away in Australia
 The Bushwackers (band) (& Bullockies Bush Band) on the album Australian Songbook 1
 Mr. Hurley & Die Pulveraffen on the album Affentheater

References

External links
 The Traditional Ballad Index

Folk ballads
Irish folk songs
Year of song unknown
Works about human migration
Songs about Australia